Leslie Robert Burks, A.S.C. (July 4, 1909 – May 11, 1968) was an American cinematographer who worked in a variety of film genres and collaborated several times with Alfred Hitchcock.

Biography 
Robert Burks was born in Chino, California on July 4, 1909. At age nineteen, he began working as a special effects technician in the Warner Brother's Lab, the industry's largest special effects facility at the time. Burks was promoted to assistant cameraman in 1929, to operating cameraman in 1934, and to special effects cinematographer in 1938. He was promoted to Director of Photography in 1944.

With his last promotion at age 35, Burks became the youngest fully accredited DP in the industry. Burks left Warner Bros. alongside Alfred Hitchcock in the fall of 1953 in favor of a move to Paramount.

Burks' first Director of Photography credit was Jammin' the Blues (1944), a short film featuring leading jazz musicians of the day.

Burks is best known for his cinematography in a number of collaborations with director Alfred Hitchcock throughout the 1950s and 1960s. In his twenty five years as a DP, Burks worked on 55 features. Notable credits include The Fountainhead, Beyond the Forest, The Glass Menagerie, The Spirit of St. Louis, The Music Man, and A Patch of Blue.

In 1968, Burks died at the age of 58 alongside his wife, Elisabeth, in a fire at their home in Huntington Harbor, California.

Legacy

Cinematographic style 
Burks' cinematography is notable for its wide stylistic range. This cinematographic range gave Burks an ability to support strong directorial vision with techniques and stylistic choices that tended to remain "invisible" to the viewer, rarely calling attention to themselves.

Burks' time in special effects played a large part in the meticulous planning he did before arriving on set. From the beginning of his career, Burks' was known for a high level of involvement in the pre-production of the films he worked on, something that was uncommon for cinematographers at this time. He would next utilize miniature models of each of the films sets in order to pre-plan every lighting and camera setup in the film. This high level of planning bolstered Burks reputation for accuracy and precision when it came to technical set ups that were often unconventional. According to film scholar Christopher Beach, Burks' artistic risks resulted in some of the most visually striking films of all time.

Burks was nominated for four Academy Awards, including both best black and white photography and best color photography. Burks' only Oscar win was for To Catch a Thief, which is renowned as "a magnificent example of VistaVision technique."

When describing Burks, Byron Haskin, ASC, stated that, "his work is thoroughly excellent in every respect... [He is] honest, straightforward, resourceful and, in the true sense, a gentlemen."

Cinematography in The Wrong Man (1956) 
Burks' cinematography in the black and white photography of Hitchcock's The Wrong Man has been described as "bleakly neorealist," but its precise visual style is hard to pinpoint, instead falling "somewhere between documentary realism and film noir, with elements of Italian neorealism and moments of modernist expressionism." Hitchcock initially intended the film to be highly realist and shot entirely on location in such a way that it felt incredibly documentary, a notion that is in keeping with the films basis in a true story. Ultimately, this was not the case, and The Wrong Man required technical flexibility, as it was shot both on location in New York City and on set in Hollywood, despite appearing to be entirely on location. The demands of on location shooting in New York relied on a lighting scheme of small portable Garnelite lamps, a new invention at this time, while the remainder of the film shot in Hollywood depended on an innovative lighting scheme to imitate the naturalistic style of the on location footage.

Beyond the basic level of creating uniform lighting schemes from one location to the next, Burks' lighting style was highly intertwined with the thematics and mood of the film. He frequently utilized the lighting scheme in The Wrong Man to create a cross hatched shadow that "invoked the dominant theme of imprisonment and... of crucifixion". This visual style was supported by frequent extreme camera angles and wide angle lenses that, unlike most of Burks' photography, did call attention to themselves and, in doing so, imbued the film with a notable noir quality. These highly crafted and precise technical and artistic decisions diverge from the explicitly realist documentary style Hitchcock initially sought, and Beach notes that they reflect Burks' flexibility and capability to capture the essence of the narrative mood with his photography.

Cinematography in The Birds (1963) 
The Birds was highly reliant upon Burks' background in special effects, and is often considered to be his greatest technical achievement. Of the film's 1,500 plus shots (three times more than the usual number of shots in a production of the period), more than 400 were either trick or composite shots. The film has an affinity for closeups, particularly of Tippi Hedren, often employing heavy diffusion and a lighting scheme that utilizes a frontal slightly off-camera key that was directional in addition to an eyelight next to the camera as well as some backlight.

One of the greatest challenges lay in the realism of the birds themselves, which were initially all mechanical models intended to appear natural. Burks was not satisfied with the look of these fake birds, and instead proposed the use of a combination of real birds and special effects that would allow the birds to appear more realistic. Along with special effects editor Brad Hoffman, Burks used his knowledge of special effects to manipulate pre-existing footage of birds that could then be utilized in the film. In the end, Burks spent over a year planning, shooting, reshooting, and overseeing special effects on The Birds to create what is now seen in the final cut.

Burks' was also involved in one of the film's most famous and technically impressive scenes, which occurs at its conclusion in the shot of the Brenner's driveway. It required a combination of thirty two different exposures as well as one of Whitlock's matte paintings.

Hitchcock stated, "If Bob Burks and the rest of us hadn't been technicians ourselves the film would have cost $5 million [instead of $3 million]." Brad Hoffman further lauded Burks' contribution, saying the film "never could have been made [without Burks]. It was his persistence in doing these shots over and over that made The Birds the classic it is today."

Cinematography in Marnie (1964) 

Marnie, the final collaboration between Hitchcock and Burks, is often referenced as Burks' greatest cinematographic achievement. The film plays with extremes of color as well as exploring the manipulation of telephoto and wide-angle lenses, garnering reactions that were equally extreme. While some lauded the film for its experimental nature, others found the radical style "audacious" and "visually clumsy." The film was highly indicative of the art cinema movement of the 1960s, and according to James Morrison in the International Directory of Films and Filmmakers, the film's experimental style was ahead of its time.

In terms of color, "the film avoids warm and bright colors, instead emphasizing subdued tones that would allow for the selective use of two primary colors: red and yellow." This experimentation with color was particularly effective in flashback sequences, where tones were highly desaturated to evoke the feeling of a long suppressed memory.

Burks' voyeuristic camera movement in the film was more radical than anything he had done previously, alternating between "tightly framed compositions shot with 50mm fixed lenses and striking camera moves, including backward and forward zooms, elaborate tracking shots pans, crane shots, Dutch angles, and even the combination zoom and dolly shot."

As in The Birds, the film also uses extreme close ups of Tippi Hedren. According to Hitchcock biographer Donald Spoto, the director gave Burks "unusual instructions about photographing her face – the camera was to come as close as possible, the lenses were almost to make love to her. For a scene in which she is kissed by Sean Connery, the close-up is so tight, the frame filled so fully with pressing lips, that the tone is virtually pornographic."

Burks and Hitchcock 
Burks is best known for his collaborative relationship with director Alfred Hitchcock, acting as cinematographer on twelve of Hitchcock's films in the 1950s and 1960s. Burks' prior experience with special effects complemented Hitchcock's own affinity for special effects .

The pair's partnership began with Hitchcock's 1951 Strangers on a Train, which garnered Burks his first Oscar nomination. The pair's collaborations also include: I Confess (1953), Dial M For Murder (1954, 3-D, Warner Color), Rear Window (1954, Technicolor), To Catch a Thief (1955, VistaVision, Technicolor), The Trouble with Harry (1955, VistaVision, Technicolor), The Man Who Knew Too Much (1956, VistaVision, Technicolor), The Wrong Man (1956), Vertigo (1958, VistaVision, Technicolor), North by Northwest (1959, VistaVision, Technicolor), The Birds (1963, Technicolor), and Marnie (1964, Technicolor).

Hitchcock's own proficiency in special effects made his directorial style a good match for Burks, allowing for cinematographic experimentation, as his writing often prompted "unusual camera imagery."

Other collaborators 
In addition to Hitchcock, Burks did work with a number of other directors on multiple projects:

Delmer Daves: To the Victor, A Kiss in the Dark, and Task Force

Don Siegel: Hitler Lives! and Star in the Night

King Vidor: The Fountainhead and Beyond the Forest

Gordon Douglas: Come Fill the Cup, Mara Maru, and So This is Love (The Grace Moore Story)

John Farrow: Hondo, The Boy from Oklahoma

Robert Mulligan: The Rat Race and The Great Imposter

A particularly important relationship was that of Burks and operative cameraman Leonard J. South, who worked alongside Burks on all twelve films he photographed for Hitchcock. Another important Hitchcock collaborator, screenwriter John Michael Hayes, stated that Burks "gave Hitchcock marvelous ideas [and] contributed greatly to every picture [he shot] during those years."

Other important works 
In the early years of his career as a DP at Warner Bros, Burks worked on projects with prominent directors, including Task Force (Delmer Daves, 1948), The Fountainhead (King Vidor, 1949), Beyond the Forest (Vidor, 1949), The Glass Menagerie (Irving Rapper, 1950), and The Enforcer (Bretaigne Windust and Raoul Walsh, 1950). Burks' cinematography on The Fountainhead was recognized by the Motion Picture Academy on the short list for the ten best photographed black and white films of 1949.

Filmography

Films as special effects photographer 

 Marked Woman, 1937
 Brother Orchid, 1940
 A Dispatch from Reuters, 1940
 They Drive by Night, 1940
 The Story of Dr. Ehrlich's Magic Bullet, 1940
 King's Row, 1941
 Highway West, 1941
 In This Our Life, 1942
 Arsenic and Old Lace, 1944
 Pride of the Marines, 1945
 God Is My Co-Pilot, 1945
 Night and Day, 1946
 The Verdict, 1946
 The Two Mrs. Carrolls, 1947
 My Wild Irish Rose, 1947
 Possessed, 1947
 The Unfaithful, 1947
 Cry Wolf, 1947
 The Unsuspected, 1947
 The Woman in White, 1948
 Key Largo, 1948
 Romance on the High Seas, 1948
 Smart Girls Don't Talk, 1948
 John Loves Mary, 1949
 The Younger Brothers, 1949
 The Miracle of Our Lady of Fatima, 1952

Films as cinematographer: 

 Jammin' the Blues, 1944
 Make Your Own Bed, 1944
 Escape in the Desert, 1945
 Hitler Lives!, 1945
 Star in the Night, 1945
 To the Victor, 1948
 A Kiss in the Dark, 1948
 Task Force, 1949
 The Fountainhead, 1949
 Beyond the Forest, 1949
 The Glass Menagerie, 1950
 Room for One More, 1951
 Close to My Heart, 1951
 The Enforcer, 1951
 Strangers on a Train, 1951
 Tomorrow is Another Day, 1951
 Come Fill the Cup, 1951
 Mara Maru, 1952
 I Confess, 1953
 The Desert Song, 1953
 Hondo, 1953
 The Boy from Oklahoma, 1953
 So This Is Love, 1953
 Dial M for Murder, 1954
 Rear Window, 1954
 To Catch a Thief, 1955
 The Trouble with Harry, 1955
 The Man Who Knew Too Much, 1956
 The Vagabond King, 1956
 The Wrong Man, 1956
 The Spirit of St. Louis, 1957
 Vertigo, 1958
 The Black Orchid, 1958
 North By Northwest, 1959
 But Not for Me, 1959
 The Rat Race, 1960
 The Great Imposter, 1960
 The Pleasure of His Company, 1961
 The Music Man, 1962
 The Birds, 1963
 Marnie, 1964
 Once a Thief, 1965
 A Patch of Blue, 1965
 A Covenant with Death, 1966
 Waterhole #3, 1967

Academy Awards
Nominee -  Best Black and White Photography Strangers on a Train 1951

Nominee - Best Color Photography Rear Window 1954

Winner - Best Color Photography To Catch a Thief 1955

Nominee - Best Black and White Photography A Patch of Blue 1965

References

External links and further reading

"Hitchcock Blonde" by Stephen Pizzello. American Cinematographer; Oct 2012; 93,10; Screen Studies Collection

1909 births
1968 deaths
American cinematographers
Accidental deaths in California
Best Cinematographer Academy Award winners
Deaths from fire in the United States
People from Chino, California